Treryn Dinas is a headland near Treen, on the Penwith peninsula between Penberth Cove and Porthcurno in Cornwall, England.

It is a scheduled monument, and is owned by the National Trust.

It is the site of a promontory fort dated to the Iron Age. The promontory slopes away steeply to the sea on three sides, and on the landward (north) side there are widely spaced defensive earthworks. The South West Coast Path runs alongside the outer rampart.

This rocky headland is the subject of an engraving of a painting by Thomas Allom entitled Treryn Castle in Fisher's Drawing Room Scrap Book (1833), together with a poetical illustration by Letitia Elizabeth Landon.

References

Hill forts in Cornwall
Headlands of Cornwall
Iron Age sites in Cornwall
Scheduled monuments in Cornwall
National Trust properties in Cornwall